Nagorny is a rural locality (a settlement) in Yekaterinoslavsky Selsoviet of Oktyabrsky District, Amur Oblast, Russia. The population was 33 as of 2018. There are 4 streets.

Geography 
Nagorny is located 13 km northwest of Yekaterinoslavka (the district's administrative centre) by road. Urozhaynoye is the nearest rural locality.

References 

Rural localities in Oktyabrsky District, Amur Oblast